The Baju Rantai (also known as Badjoe-Rante, Baju Besi, Baju Rante, Wadjoe-Rante, and Waju Rante) is a type of armor from Nusantara archipelago (Indonesia, Malaysia, Brunei, and Philippines).

Etymology 
The name originates from old Javanese words, baju comes from waju meaning jacket, clothing or apparel, meanwhile rantai comes from rante, rantay, or ranti which mean chain, string, or wreath.

Description
The Baju Rantai is a chain armor that is worked in the form of a shirt. It consists of small iron rings. It has no collar and sleeves that reach about to the elbow. The lower end is approximately at the height of the thighs. It is used by various ethnic groups in Indonesia.

History 

One of the earliest mention of Baju Rantai is in Kidung Ranggalawe, a javanese kidung text that tells about the rebellion of Ranggalawe against Majapahit in 1295 A.D.. The name in the text is waju rante, which means apparel consisting of iron chains. Zoetmulder noted the use of special apparel for soldiers: In his research about old Javanese he found a troops called bala winaju gangsa ranti, which means soldier dressed with gangsa ranti. Gangsa (from sanskrit: kangśa) refers to a kind of copper and lead alloy, while ranti means chain.

The Hikayat Banjar noted the Bhayangkara equipments in the Majapahit palace, which includes:
Maka kaluar dangan parhiasannya orang barbaju-rantai ampat puluh sarta padangnya barkupiah taranggos sakhlat merah, orang mambawa astenggar ampat puluh, orang mambawa parisai sarta padangnya ampat puluh, orang mambawa dadap sarta sodoknya sapuluh, orang mambawa panah sarta anaknya sapuluh, yang mambawa tumbak parampukan barsulam amas ampat puluh, yang mambawa tameng Bali bartulis air mas ampat puluh.
So came out with their ornaments men with chain mail numbered forty alongside their swords and red kopiah [skull cap], men carrying astengger [arquebus] numbered forty, men carrying shield and swords numbered forty, men carrying dadap [a type of shield] and sodok [broad-bladed spear-like weapon] numbered ten, men carrying bows and arrows numbered ten, (men) who carried parampukan spears embroidered with gold numbered forty, (men) who carried Balinese shields with golden water engraving numbered forty.— Hikayat Banjar, 6.3

Two related ethnic communities of South Sulawesi, the Bugis and Makassarese, also adopted chain mail armor which they call as waju rante or waju ronte. The armor is made by string of iron rings tied together, which makes it similar to knitwork. The Bugis and Makassarese soldiers were known for using chain mail and muskets which they made themselves.

See also 

Baju lamina
Baju empurau
Baru Öröba
Baru Lema'a
Karambalangan
Kawaca
Siping-siping

Notes

References

Further reading
 William G. Shellabear: An English–Malay Dictionary. Methodist Publishing House, Singapore 1916, (Digitalisat). 

Indonesian inventions
Asian armour
Body armor
Military equipment of antiquity
Military equipment of Indonesia